Movie Talk is an Irish television programme broadcast on RTÉ One from September to November 2012. 
The ten part series profiled figures from the Irish film world who talk about their careers in movies.

Episodes
 Programme 1 –  Brendan Gleeson
 Programme 2 –  Fionnula Flanagan
 Programme 3 –  Jim Sheridan
 Programme 4 –  Anjelica Huston
 Programme 5 –  John Boorman
 Programme 6 –  Saoirse Ronan
 Programme 7 –  Neil Jordan
 Programme 8 –  Gabriel Byrne
 Programme 9 –  Noel Pearson
 Programme 10 –  John Moore

References

2012 Irish television series debuts
RTÉ original programming